The South Milwaukee Passenger Station is a historic railroad station located at 1111 Milwaukee Ave., South Milwaukee, Wisconsin. The station was built in 1893 for the Chicago & Northwestern Railway replacing a frame depot from 1885. Architect Charles Sumner Frost designed the Romanesque station. The depot, located on the east (southbound) platform, included ladies and gentlemen's waiting rooms, restrooms, a ticket office, freight office, train dispatcher's office, and two large rooms for baggage, express, and storage. 

Following complaints from station agent Edwin Myers in 1947, the station was renovated. The arched porch area and several doorways were bricked in and many of the windows were boarded up with plywood.

In 1971, the station closed when the line was cut back from Milwaukee to Kenosha. Amtrak soon replaced private passenger rail service in the United States.

The depot was added to the National Register of Historic Places in 1978.

References

Buildings and structures in Milwaukee County, Wisconsin
Railway stations on the National Register of Historic Places in Wisconsin
Romanesque Revival architecture in Wisconsin
Railway stations in the United States opened in 1893
Former Chicago and North Western Railway stations
National Register of Historic Places in Milwaukee County, Wisconsin
Railway stations closed in 1971
Former railway stations in Wisconsin